League1 Canada (L1C) is a national soccer competition in Canada which acts as the third tier in the Canadian soccer league system below the Canadian Premier League, consisting of the highest level sanctioned provincial league in three of the provinces of Canada.

League1 Canada is contested by clubs from three divisions; these are League1 Ontario, League1 British Columbia, and the Première ligue de soccer du Québec for both the men's and women's divisions. L1C is overseen by Canada Soccer Business, in partnership with participating provincial member federations. Dino Rossi has served as league president since May 2022.

History
In 2011, the Première ligue de soccer du Québec was established to begin play in 2012, marking the return of semi-professional soccer in the province of Quebec. In 2013, League1 Ontario was founded as a semi-professional league by the Ontario Soccer Association to begin play in 2014 with a men's division, followed by a women's division in 2015. After multiple years of consideration, League1 British Columbia began play in 2022 in both the male and female divisions.

On March 31, 2022, League1 Canada was announced as an alliance of the three existing Division III pro-am leagues, aligning the national soccer pathway. L1O and L1BC adopted new logos that day, with the PLSQ transitioning to a common logo for 2023.

From August 12 to 14, 2022, the inaugural Women's Interprovincial Championship was held in Laval, Quebec. The competition was a four-team knockout tournament featuring the champions of each of the three divisions, as well as an additional team from the PLSQ (allocated as host). A.S. Blainville won the inaugural title. The 2023 tournament is scheduled to be held in British Columbia.

In March 2023, League1 Alberta was announced with a five-team exhibition series to be played that summer. The league plans to officially launch for the 2024 season.

Provincial competitions

Leagues
The league champion for League1 Ontario and League1 British Columbia  is determined through a playoffs tournament, while the league champion for the PLSQ is determined through the season standings.

League cups
Not to be confused with a league's playoff phase.

Interprovincial competitions

See also

 Canadian soccer league system
 Inter-Provincial Cup (soccer) – a defunct super cup competition between the L1O and PLSQ champions.
 National Premier Leagues – a grouping of Australian regional soccer leagues
 Canadian Hockey League

References

 
Soccer leagues in Canada
Recurring sporting events established in 2022
2022 establishments in Canada
Sports leagues established in 2022
Canada